Paris Sous Les Bombes (Paris Under The Bombs) is the third album by French hip hop group Suprême NTM.

Track listing
"Intro"
Contains samples from "American Tango" by Weather Report
"Plus jamais ça" – 4:46
"Tout n'est pas si facile" – 4:50
Contains samples from "The Sea Lion" by Grover Washington, Jr., "It's Your Love" by Ethel Beatty, and "Go Steta I" by Stetsasonic
"Come again (Pour que ça sonne funk)" – 4:05
Contains samples from "Fo-fi-fo" by Pieces of a Dream and "Chief Rocka" by Lords of the Underground
"Qu'est-ce qu'on attend ?" – 4:11
Contains samples from "Water Babies" by Miles Davis and "Raise the Roof" by Public Enemy
"Nouvelle École" – 4:02
Contains samples from "Mic Checka" by Das EFX
"Le Rêve" – 4:17
Contains samples from "Fightin' Fire With Fire" by The Bar-Kays
"Old Skool" – 3:05
Contains samples from "Vein Melter" by Herbie Hancock
"Intro (Paris sous les bombes)" – 0:41
"Paris sous les bombes" – 4:18
Contains samples from "My Melody" by Eric B. & Rakim
"Pass pass le oinj" – 4:08
"Qui paiera les dégâts? (DJ Clyde remix)" – 4:29
Contains samples from "Illegal Business" by Boogie Down Productions
Contains samples from "Tensity" by Cannonball Adderley
"Sista B. (intermède)" – 0:40
"Est-ce la vie ou moi ?" – 5:23
Contains samples from "Witch Doctor's Brew" by Magnum
"La Fièvre" – 4:05
Contains samples from "My Lady" by The Crusaders
"Popopop !!, freestyle" – 3:58
"Outro" – 2:15
Contains samples from "Theme from Trouble Man" by Marvin Gaye and "Straighten It Out" by Pete Rock & CL Smooth
"Come Again 2 (remix)" (bonus track) - 3:43
Featuring Big Red
"Saint-Denis Style/Affirmative Action (Remix)" (bonus track) - 4:04
Featuring Nas

1995 albums
Epic Records albums
Suprême NTM albums